Stradonice is a municipality and village in Kladno District in the Central Bohemian Region of the Czech Republic. It has about 100 inhabitants.

Notable people
The prominent German chemist August Kekulé was descended from a family originating in Stradonice. When Kekulé was ennobled in 1895 by Kaiser Wilhelm II of Germany, he gained the right to add "von Stradonitz" to his name, referring to this ancestral origin. This title was also used by his son Stephan Kekulé von Stradonitz and his nephew Reinhard Kekulé von Stradonitz.

References

Villages in Kladno District